Kosmos 1030 ( meaning Cosmos 1030) was a Soviet US-K missile early warning satellite which was launched in 1978 as part of the Soviet military's Oko programme. The satellite was designed to identify missile launches using optical telescopes and infrared sensors.

Launch
Kosmos 1030 was launched from Site 43/4 at Plesetsk Cosmodrome in the Russian SSR. A Molniya-M carrier rocket with a 2BL upper stage was used to perform the launch, which took place at 03:04 UTC on 6 September 1978.

Orbit
The launch successfully placed the satellite into a molniya orbit. It subsequently received its Kosmos designation, and the international designator 1978-083A. The United States Space Command assigned it the Satellite Catalog Number 11015.

Podvig says that it self-destructed and that its orbit was never stabilised.

See also

 1978 in spaceflight
 List of Kosmos satellites (1001–1250)
 List of Oko satellites
 List of R-7 launches (1975-1979)

References

Kosmos satellites
Oko
1978 in spaceflight
Spacecraft launched in 1978
Spacecraft launched by Molniya-M rockets
Spacecraft which reentered in 2004